Revaya is a moshav in the Beit She'an Valley in northern Israel. Located about six kilometres south of Beit She'an, near Sde Trumot and west of Israel Highway 90, it falls under the jurisdiction of Valley of Springs Regional Council.

The moshav is one of four settlements in a group: Revaya, Sde Trumot, Tel Teomim, and Rehov.  These four settlements were established near one another and form a group together.

History
The moshav was founded in 1952 by the Hapoel Hamizrachi organization and was settled by Jewish immigrants to Israel from Iraq and Morocco. It was originally named "P'rona B", corresponding to the adjacent "P'rona" (Tel Rehov); the name was later changed to Revaya, corresponding to the nearby Revaya spring (the Hebrew word "revaya" means "overflowing" or "saturated").

The moshav accepted some Ethiopian Jews who immigrated to Israel in the 1990s. As of 2000, Revaya encompassed about 2,000 dunams.

References

Populated places established in 1952
Moshavim
Populated places in Northern District (Israel)
1952 establishments in Israel
Ethiopian-Jewish culture in Israel
Iraqi-Jewish culture in Israel
Moroccan-Jewish culture in Israel